Jana Carpenter (born January 26, 1971) is an American actress, singer and guitarist based in the UK. She has appeared in TV and radio series, episodes and films and is also a vocalist and guitarist in the countryfolk or harmony band Piefinger, and the Mercury Prize-nominated experimental rock band Sweet Billy Pilgrim.

Early life
Carpenter was born in Andrews Air Force Base, Maryland on January 26, 1971.

Career
Carpenter provided the English voice of Norie in the English dub of Roujin Z. She played roles in films such as The Criminal, Demon Wheels, and Private Life.

In the first series of the revived British programme Doctor Who, Carpenter played the role of De Maggio, a soldier who protects the Metaltron Cage with Bywater (John Schwab), in the episode of the first series "Dalek".

Personal life
Carpenter has been married to writer and director Julian Simpson since 2005.

Filmography

Film

Television

Radio
 2011  Bad Memories. Imogen Blake. BBC Radio 4
 2017 Mythos, Glamis. Libby Ward. BBC Radio 4.
 The Lovecraft Investigations. Kennedy Fisher. BBC Radio 4.
 2018 The Case of Charles Dexter Ward
 2019 The Whisperer in Darkness
 2020 The Shadow Over Innsmouth

 2022 Who Is Aldrich Kemp? Kennedy Fisher. BBC Radio 4.

External links
 

1971 births
British television actresses
British women singers
British women guitarists
People from Glen Ellyn, Illinois
Living people
American expatriates in England
American television actresses
21st-century British women singers
21st-century British guitarists
21st-century American women
21st-century women guitarists